Delphos Jefferson High School (DJHS), is a public high school in Delphos, Ohio, United States.  It is the only high school in the Delphos City School District and serves students in grades 9–12 living in the city of Delphos and parts of neighboring Washington, Marion, and Jennings Townships. School colors are red and white and athletic teams are known as the Wildcats. DJHS competes in the Ohio High School Athletic Association (OHSAA) as a charter member of the Northwest Conference. As of the 2018–19 school year, the school had an enrollment of 303 students and a faculty of 22 teachers, for a student-teacher ratio of 13.77.

State championships

 Baseball - 1931

See also
List of high schools in Ohio

References

External links
 

High schools in Van Wert County, Ohio
High schools in Allen County, Ohio
Public high schools in Ohio
Jefferson High School